Men's cricket at the 2019 South Asian Games was held in Kirtipur, Nepal from 3 to 9 December 2019. The men's tournament featured under-23 squads from Bangladesh and Sri Lanka and senior squads from Bhutan, Maldives and Nepal. India and Pakistan did not participate.

The Bangladesh team won the gold medal, after they beat Sri Lanka by seven wickets in the final. In the third-place playoff, Nepal beat the Maldives by five wickets to win bronze.

Format
The five participating nations played matches on a round-robin basis. The top two teams progressed to the final, while the third and fourth sides advanced to the bronze medal match.

Squads
Bangladesh and Sri Lanka sent under-23 squads, although they were each permitted to select up to three older players.

Round-robin stage

Points table

Fixtures

Medal round

Bronze medal match

Gold medal match

See also 
 Cricket at the 2019 South Asian Games – Women's tournament

References

External links
 Series home at ESPN Cricinfo
Official Website of 2019 South Asian Games

Associate international cricket competitions in 2019–20
International cricket competitions in Nepal
Cricket